"High on Love" is a song written by Jeff Hanna and Kostas, and recorded by American country music artist Patty Loveless.  It was released in June 1998 as the third single from the album Long Stretch of Lonesome.  The song reached #20 on the Billboard Hot Country Singles & Tracks chart.

Chart performance

References

1998 singles
Patty Loveless songs
Songs written by Kostas (songwriter)
Song recordings produced by Emory Gordy Jr.
Epic Records singles
Songs written by Jeff Hanna
1997 songs